Nadezda Likhacheva (born 18 August 1995) is a Kazakhstani weightlifter.

She won a bronze medal at the 2018 World Weightlifting Championships.

References

External links

IWRP profile

1995 births
Living people
Kazakhstani female weightlifters
World Weightlifting Championships medalists
21st-century Kazakhstani women